Crichel is a civil parish in East Dorset, England. It was formed on 1 April 2015 following the merger of Long Crichel and Moor Crichel parishes.

It is near the town of Blandford Forum. The 18th century Crichel House is a Grade I listed Classical Revival country house in the parish.

References

External links

Civil parishes in Dorset
East Dorset District
Populated places established in 2015